Walkeringham railway station was a station in Walkeringham, Nottinghamshire. The station opened on 15 July 1867 and closed for passengers on 2 February 1959, although freight services continued until 19 August 1963 and trains between Gainsborough and Doncaster continue to pass through.

References

Bibliography

Disused railway stations in Nottinghamshire
Former Great Northern and Great Eastern Joint Railway stations
Railway stations in Great Britain opened in 1867
Railway stations in Great Britain closed in 1959